Long tail is a consumer demographic in business.

Long tail or Longtail may also refer to:
The Long Tail (book), a popular book about the effect of Long Tail on the web media
Power law's long tail, a statistics term describing certain kinds of distribution
Long-tail boat, a type of watercraft native to Southeast Asia
Long-tail distribution, a probability distribution that assigns relatively high probabilities to regions far from the mean or median
Long-tail traffic, telecommunication traffic that exhibits a long-tail distribution
Long-tailed macaque, also called the crab-eating macaque
Longtail (bicycle), type of bicycle with a longer than usual frame wheelbase
Longtail (rat), euphemism used to denote a rat on the Isle of Man
Longtail Studios, Canadian video game company
White-tailed tropicbird, or longtail in Bermuda, a type of bird